The iDol is a 2006 film made and produced by independent filmmaker, Norman England. A science fiction satire, filmed entirely in Japan, The iDol tells the story of a Japanese collector who comes into possession of a figure with origins not of this world. It is a satirical look at the world of "otaku" and the mass marketing of media culture, so prevalent in Japan, that creates these legion of obsessed fans. The iDol was a small production which did not receive worldwide attention due to its limited budget of $25,000.

The iDol premiered at the Fantasia Festival in Montreal, Quebec, Canada on July 16, 2006 and has subsequently played at various festivals around the world. It was shown on television for the first time on Japan's SKY Perfect satellite channel on March 3, 2008.

Plot
Ken is a mild-mannered man in his mid-twenties who, like many men his age, has interests that stopped developing during adolescence. On a visit to a local toy collectors' shop, he acquires a rare alien action figure. Unexpectedly, Ken's world is turned inside out as the somewhat silly looking toy alters his life by benevolently giving him everything he has ever dreamed of and then callously taking it all back.

Ken's immature desires and indecisive nature are pit against a collection of seemingly normal, yet equally misguided characters who are meant to illustrate how people are victims of a socially implanted drive for things not in their own best interests.

Production
First time director, Norman England, felt the urge to direct his own film after a year spent as a reporter on the set of the 2001 movie Godzilla, Mothra and King Ghidorah: Giant Monsters All-Out Attack. His idea for The iDol came in early 2002 while travelling on the subway in Tokyo, where he sketched a drawing of the alien figure and wrote a short synopsis.

England wrote the first version of the script in English. The Japanese version, on which he worked closely with Japanese scriptwriter Jiro Kaneko, was initially written as a literal translation of the English, however, readers responded saying it "came across like subtitles". This version of the script was abandoned, and England and Kaneko rewrote it from a purely Japanese perspective. Takashi Yamazaki also rewrote the script while he was directing Always Sanchōme no Yūhi. England produced the final script combining elements from his and Kaneko's version and Yamazaki's.

Casting began in 2004. Lead actor Jin Sasaki was recommended by director Shusuke Kaneko, with whom he worked on the TV series Holy Land. Takako Fuji joined the production after director England saw her performance on the set of the 2004 movie The Grudge.

Shooting took place over 10 days in August 2005, filming around Shimokitazawa, Shibuya, Shiba Park, Tamagawa River and at the Tokyo Film Centre School of Arts.

Distribution
The iDol first premiered at the Fantasia Festival in Montreal on July 16, 2006.

Other festival screenings have included The Festival of Fantastic Films (Manchester, England - Sep 2006), Lyon Asian Film Festival (Lyon, France - Sep 2006), Nipponbashi International Film Festival (Osaka, Japan - Nov 2006), Kansai International Film Festival (Osaka, Japan - Oct 2007), Club Bollywood (Osaka, Japan - Oct 2007), Vancouver Comicon (Vancouver, British Columbia, Canada - Oct 2007), Yubari International Fantastic Film Festival (Yubari, Japan - Mar 2008), Japanisches Filmfest Hamburg (Hamburg, Germany - May 2008), Lost Plus One (Tokyo, Japan - Apr 2009).

The iDol had its television premiere on March 22, 2008 on Japan's SKY Perfect satellite channel.

Cast
Jin Sasaki as Ken
Erina Hayase as Mayuka
Mitsu Katahira as Yamada
Masayasu Nakanishi as Tanaka
Takako Fuji as Rika
Hirotaka Miyama as Taki
Tomoo Haraguchi as Boss Goro
Toshiyuki Watarai as Alien-Kun
Takashi Yamazaki as Cameraman
Yukijiro Hotaru as Homeless Man

References

External links
 

2006 science fiction films
2006 films
Films shot in Tokyo
Japanese science fiction films
2000s Japanese-language films
Films scored by Kow Otani
2000s Japanese films